Tribromofluoromethane or Halon 1103 or R 11B3 is a fully halogenated mixed halomethane or, more exactly, a bromofluorocarbon (BFC). It is a colorless liquid.

Tribromofluoromethane can be used in fire extinguishers.

Physical appearance 
It is a clear yellow fluid.

Table of physical properties

External links 
 Raman and infrared spectra of solid tribromofluoromethane
 Entry at chem007.com

References

Halomethanes
Fire suppression agents
Tribromomethyl compounds
Organofluorides